Newark is an unincorporated community in Kearney County, Nebraska, United States.

History
A post office was established at Newark in the 1870s. It was likely named by a settler who was a native of Newark, New Jersey.

References

Unincorporated communities in Kearney County, Nebraska
Unincorporated communities in Nebraska